Geauga County is a county in the U.S. state of Ohio. As of the 2020 census, the population was 95,397. The county seat and largest city is Chardon. The county is named for an Onondaga or Seneca language word meaning 'raccoon', originally the name of the Grand River. Geauga County is part of the Cleveland-Elyria, OH Metropolitan Statistical Area. In 2008, Forbes Magazine ranked Geauga County as the fourth best place in the United States to raise a family. About 20% of the county's population is Amish, .

History
Geauga County is named after the Onondaga word jyo’ä·gak or Seneca jo’ä·ka, both meaning 'raccoon' (originally the name of the Grand River).

After the discovery of the New World, the land that became Geauga County was originally part of the French colony of Canada (New France), which was ceded in 1763 to Great Britain and renamed Province of Quebec. In the late 18th century the land became part of the Connecticut Western Reserve in the Northwest Territory, and then was purchased by the Connecticut Land Company in 1795.

Geauga County was founded on March 1, 1806, as the second county in the Connecticut Western Reserve, originating from Trumbull County, Ohio. In 1808, the size of Geauga County was reduced by the creation of Ashtabula County, Cuyahoga County, and Lake County.

The present-day boundaries were established in 1840 following the creation of Lake County. A disagreement about the location of the county seat began in 1808 when commissioners from Trumbull County began the process of identifying the seat of justice.  Residents in the northern townships wanted the seat in Champion, renamed Painesville, Ohio in 1832.  Residents in southern townships desired a centrally located county seat and took advantage of a tract of land donated by Peter Chardon Brooks called Chardon, Ohio. Despite Chardon being selected in 1809, the argument was never really settled. Over the next two decades, population growth in the seven northern townships exceeded the remaining sixteen southern townships, further fueling the disagreement. On January 21, 1840, a petition to create Lake County from seven townships in northern Geauga County and Willoughby Township from Cuyahoga County were presented to the Ohio House of Representatives. Seabury Ford presented petitions against its creation. Lake County was established in March 1840 by the Ohio state legislature. As the newly formed Lake County did not have sufficient territory to meet the requirements for a county, the northern border included submerged land beneath the waters of Lake Erie.

The first settlement in Geauga was at Burton, Ohio in the year 1798, when three families settled there from Connecticut.

Geography

Geauga County receives the most precipitation of any county in northern Ohio, with most of the county receiving over 42 inches annually in an average year, and some parts exceeding 44 inches.

Drainage system
The geography of Geauga County was radically changed by Illinoian and Wisconsinan glaciation, which is evident in the deranged drainage system, landscape change, and glacial till. The headwaters of three watercourses in the Lake Erie basin are in Geauga County. These include the Cuyahoga River, Chagrin River, and Grand River. Portions of all three are designated Ohio Scenic Rivers.

Point sources of the east branch of the Cuyahoga River are in Hambden Township, Claridon Township, and Burton Township,.  The point source of the west branch of the Cuyahoga River is near the intersection of Pond and Rapids Roads in Burton Township.

The point sources of the east branch of the Chagrin River are at Bass Lake in Munson Township and the southwest corner of the city of Chardon. McFarland Creek in Bainbridge Township, sometimes referred to as Chagrin Falls because of the postal zip code, is a tributary of the  Aurora branch of the Chagrin River.

Point sources of the Grand River are in Parkman Township, Troy Township, and Swine Creek in Middlefield Township.

While the majority of waterways in Geauga County are part of the Lake Erie watershed, the Silver Creek in Troy Township is a tributary to the west branch of the Mahoning River, part of the Ohio River watershed, the largest tributary to the Mississippi River.  There is another Silver Creek in Geauga County in Russell Township, which is a tributary to the east branch of the Chagrin River.

Adjacent counties
 Lake County (north)
 Ashtabula County (northeast)
 Trumbull County (southeast)
 Portage County (south)
 Cuyahoga County (west)
 Summit County (southwest)

Demographics

2000 census
As of the census of 2010, there were 93,389 people, 34,264 households, and 25,654 families residing in the county. The population density was 231.1 people per square mile (89.3/km2). There were 34,264 occupied housing units at an average density of 84.8 per square mile (32.8/km2). The racial makeup of the county was 97.0% White, 1.4% Black or African American, 0.1% Native American, 0.6% Asian, 0.001% Pacific Islander, 0.3% from other races, and 0.8% from two or more races. 88.1% spoke English, 4.6% German, 1.2% Spanish, and 3.3% spoke other West Germanic languages.

There were 34,264 households, out of which 31.6% had children under the age of 18 living with them, 63.8% were married couples living together, 7.70% had a female householder with no husband present, 3.50% had a male householder with no wife present, and 25.10% were non-families. 25.10% of all households were made up of individuals, and 9.50% had someone living alone who was 65 years of age or older. The average household size was 2.70 and the average family size was 3.16.

In the county, the population was spread out, with 26.0% under the age of 18, 6.60% from 18 to 24, 20.1% from 25 to 44, 31.8% from 45 to 64, and 15.50% who were 65 years of age or older. The median age was 43.3 years. For every 100 females there were 96.85 males. For every 100 females age 18 and over, there were 93.72 males.

As of the census of 2000, 0.59% of the population were Hispanic or Latino of any race, 26.8% were of German, 15.3% Irish, 14.3% English, 10.8% Italian 7.5% Polish and 5.2% American ancestry. According to Census 2000, 89.4% spoke English, 5.1% German, 1.5% Pennsylvania Dutch and 1.0% Spanish as their first language.

As of the census of 2000, the median income for a household in the county was $60,200, and the median income for a family was $67,427. Males had a median income of $48,443 versus $30,567 for females. The per capita income for the county was $27,944. About 2.80% of families and 4.60% of the population were below the poverty line, including 6.10% of those under age 18 and 5.10% of those age 65 or over.  The median household income and per capita income were the second highest among Ohio counties after Delaware, and 74th and 79th in the country, respectively.

2010 census
As of the 2010 United States Census, there were 93,389 people, 34,264 households, and 25,654 families residing in the county. The racial makeup of the county was 96.9% white, 1.3% black or African American, 0.6% Asian, 0.1% American Indian, 0.3% from other races, and 0.8% from two or more races. Those of Hispanic or Latino origin made up 1.1% of the population. In terms of ancestry, 27.4% were German, 17.1% were Irish, 13.8% were Italian, 13.8% were English, 8.3% were Polish, 5.5% were Hungarian, and 3.6% were American.

Of the 34,264 households, 33.6% had children under the age of 18 living with them, 63.8% were married couples living together, 7.7% had a female householder with no husband present, 25.1% were non-families, and 21.2% of all households were made up of individuals. The average household size was 2.70 and the average family size was 3.16. The median age was 43.3 years.

The median income for a household in the county was $89,663 and the median income for a family was $101,780. Males had a median income of $94,863 versus $40,565 for females. The per capita income for the county was $32,735. About 5.0% of families and 7.6% of the population were below the poverty line, including 10.8% of those under age 18 and 6.4% of those age 65 or over.

Amish settlement 

There is a large Amish community founded in 1886 in Geauga County. It is the fourth largest of all Amish settlements with 18,650 people in 132 congregations in 2017. In 2017 the Amish accounted for 19.8% of Geauga County's population.

Politics
Geauga County is a Republican stronghold, having voted Democratic only once since 1856, in Lyndon Johnson's landslide, but Franklin D. Roosevelt came within just 220 votes in 1936.

|}

Transportation

U.S. highways
  U.S. Route 6 Grand Army of the Republic Highway honoring American Civil War Veterans
  U.S. Route 322
  U.S. Route 422

State highways

  State Route 43
  State Route 44
  State Route 86
  State Route 87
  State Route 88
  State Route 166
  State Route 168
  State Route 306
  State Route 528
  State Route 608
  State Route 700

An official Geauga County Road Map

Public transportation
The mostly rural nature of Geauga County limits the feasibility of a fixed-route transit system. Instead, Geauga County Transit offers a demand-responsive door-to-door transit system within the county with some out-of-county service. , one-way fares for door-to-door service were $6.00, with 50% discounts for the elderly, disabled, or children 6 years to 17 years old. Children 5-years and younger are free. Out-of-county fares are two times the posted in-county fares. Service is provided 6:00 AM to 9:00 PM Monday through Friday. Reservations are suggested with at least three days notice, but can be made up to one week in advance.

Airports

Geauga County is home to one public airport in Middlefield, Ohio. The Geauga County Airport call sign is 7G8. It is home to Experimental Aircraft Association Chapter 5.

The Geauga County Airport sits on 41 acres purchased by the Middlefield Chamber of Commerce and donated to Geauga County. Ground was broken August 31, 1967 and it was officially opened September 29, 1968. The airport has one 3500' long by 65' wide runway. Runway numbers are 11 on the west end and 29 on the east end. There are two T-hangars, one private hangar, two community hangars, a pilot lounge and restroom facility.

Education

Public school districts
Geauga County is home to six public school districts as illustrated in this list of school districts in Ohio.

The Geauga County Educational Service Center provides collaborative programs and services for the seven local school districts in Geauga County, leveraging resources to reduce overall costs to each district. The ESC has formed a P-16 bridge initiative whose mission is to create workforce readiness in our youth and adults through substantive partnerships between educators, businesses, community organizations, parents focusing on important transitions experienced at each level. Geauga County P-16 will develop a sustainable process and program to insure its continued success.

In addition, there are five neighboring public school districts that serve portions of Geauga County residents.

Joint Vocational School District
Taxpayers in six of the seven school districts in Geauga County support a Joint Vocational School District (JVSD) at the Auburn Career Center in Concord Township, Ohio. The career center offers a variety of programs in health, education, and hands-on technology.

Private and parochial schools
Geauga County is home to eight private, parochial, and/or specialized schools.

Higher education
Geauga County has one institution of higher learning:
 Kent State University - Geauga is in Burton, Ohio. KSU - Geauga is one of seven regional campuses of Kent State University. The  Burton Township campus was established as an academic center in 1964 and became a regional campus in 1976. , more than 2,000 full and part-time students were enrolled.  The Geauga campus does not have any student housing. KSU -Geauga offers a variety of academic programs, including certificate programs, Associate's degrees, and Bachelor's degrees in business, education, general studies, nursing, science, and technology.

Government

Congressional representation

U.S. representation
 Ohio's 14th Congressional District

 U.S. Senate

State representation
 76th Ohio House District
 99th Ohio House District

 18th Ohio Senate District
 32nd Ohio Senate District

Judiciary
 U.S. 6th Circuit Court of Appeals

Ohio 11th District Courts of Appeals

Communities

City
 Chardon (county seat)

Villages
 Aquilla
 Burton
 Hunting Valley
 Middlefield
 South Russell

Townships

 Auburn
 Bainbridge
 Burton
 Chardon
 Chester
 Claridon
 Hambden
 Huntsburg
 Middlefield
 Montville
 Munson
 Newbury
 Parkman
 Russell
 Thompson
 Troy

Census-designated places
 Bainbridge
 Bass Lake
 Chesterland
 Parkman

Unincorporated communities

 Bostwick
 Bundysburg
 Claridon
 East Claridon
 Fowlers Mill
 Fullertown
 Hampden
 Huntsburg
 Materials Park
 Montville
 Newbury Center
 Novelty
 Popes Corners
 Russell Center
 South Newbury
 South Thompson
 Thompson
 Welshfield

Notable people
 Leman Copley, early Mormon elder 
 Larry Dolan, attorney and the owner of the Cleveland Guardians
 Seabury Ford, lawyer, governor of Ohio (1849-1850)
 Charles Martin Hall, inventor of modern aluminum production process
 Peter Hitchcock, lawyer, soldier, legislator, judge
 General Mortimer Leggett, Civil War general, commander of Volunteer Army of Ohio
 Frances Spatz Leighton, writer
 Charles C. Paine, politician
 Halbert Eleazer Paine, lawyer, Civil War Union general, congressman from Wisconsin, Commissioner of Patents (1879-1881)
 Seth Ledyard Phelps, Civil War officer, President of the District of Columbia Board of Commissioners (1878–1879)
 Albert Gallatin Riddle, lawyer, educator, Ohio House of Representatives (1848-1850)
 Nick Schuyler, author (Not Without Hope)
 JoAnn M. Tenorio, entomologist in Hawaii
 Brigham Young, Mormon leader

Athletes
 Andrew Brown, professional baseball pitcher
 Mel Harder, professional baseball pitcher for the Cleveland Indians
 Matt Hutter, NASCAR driver
 Leroy Kemp, collegiate and Olympian wrestler
 Tom Kipp, international professional motorcycle racing champion

Musical artists and groups
 Midnight Syndicate, a Gothic rock band
 John Popper, frontman for rock band Blues Traveler
 The Chardon Polka Band, a Cleveland-Style polka band

See also
 Geauga Park District
 Geauga County Fair
 Geauga County Maple Festival
 National Register of Historic Places listings in Geauga County, Ohio

References

External links

 Geauga County Government's website
 Geauga County Planning Commission Website on Industrial Parks
 Geauga Park District
 Geauga County Public Library
 City of Chardon
 Burton Village
 Great Geauga County Fair
 Geauga County Maple Festival
 OHGENWeb - Geauga County
 Public Utilities Commission of Ohio: Statewide School District Map
 Public Utilities Commission of Ohio: Statewide Zip Code Areas
 

 
1806 establishments in Ohio
Populated places established in 1806
Amish in Ohio
Ohio counties in the Western Reserve